Paul Wahl (6 October 1906 – 13 February 1982) was a German weightlifter. He competed in the men's heavyweight event at the 1936 Summer Olympics.

References

1906 births
1982 deaths
German male weightlifters
Olympic weightlifters of Germany
Weightlifters at the 1936 Summer Olympics
Sportspeople from Stuttgart